Sporosarcina soli is a Gram-positive, aerobic and spore-forming bacterium from the genus of Sporosarcina which has been isolated from soil from Suwon in Korea.

References 

Bacillales
Bacteria described in 2007